Carcharhinus is the type genus of the family Carcharhinidae, the requiem sharks. One of 12 genera in its family, it contains over half of the species therein. It contains 35 extant and eight extinct species to date, with likely more species yet to be described.

Species

Extant 

T Type species

Fossil

See also 

 List of prehistoric cartilaginous fish genera

References

Bibliography 
 
 
 
 
 
 
 

 
Shark genera
Extant Eocene first appearances
Taxa named by Henri Marie Ducrotay de Blainville